The Niblinto River is a river in Ñuble Region in the southern portion of Central Chile. It is a tributary of the Cato River.

See also
List of rivers of Chile
Los Huemules de Niblinto National Reserve

References
Evaluación de los recursos hídricos superficiales en la cuenca de superficiales en la cuenca del Bío Bío

Rivers of Chile
Rivers of Ñuble Region